The 2021–22 Angolan Basketball League, for sponsorship reasons the 2021–22 Unitel Basket, is the 44th season of the Angolan Basketball League, the highest premier basketball league in Angola. The season consisted of 13 teams and began on 22 December 2021 and ended on 10 May 2022.

Petro de Luanda won its 15th national title while also winning the Angolan Cup and Supercup this season. In all league games, Petro was unbeaten and had a 31–0 record including the playoffs.

Teams
The league expanded from 9 to 13 teams as Akira Academy, CPPL (after 6 years of absence), CAB and Interclube's B-team entered the league. 
<onlyinclude>

Regular season

(C): Champions; Source: FAB

Playoffs

Bracket

Quarterfinals
The semifinals were played on 22 April, 23 April and 24 April 2022.

|}

Semifinals
The semifinals were played on 29 April and 30 April 2022.

|}

Finals
The finals were played on 6, 7 and 10 May 2022.

|}

Games

Individual awards

Statistics

References

External links
AfroBasket season page

2021–22
Angola
2021–22 in African basketball leagues